Kiangsu-Chekiang College (Shatin), abbreviated as KCCS or KCCST, is one of the secondary schools in Sha Tin District, Hong Kong. The school campus is next to Shatin Pui Ying College.

History 
The school is one of the four schools established by the Kiangsu & Chekiang Residents (HK) Association.  When the school first opened in 1978, the permanent premises were not ready owing to a delay in the construction work.  Classes had to be conducted on the school premises of the TWGHs Fung Wong Fung Ting Secondary School.  In August 1979, the school moved into the present premises.

In 1982, the school was converted from a private capitation secondary school into a government aided secondary school.

In the years that followed, the government, the Association and the School Management Committee have continuously supported the school by providing professional advice, technical assistance and financial resources.  The past two decades, therefore, have witnessed remarkable progress in the school development with respect to the students' academic achievement, moral standard, teaching facilities and equipment.

School motto and values

"Orderly and Respectful" is the school motto and a code of behaviour is set for the students to follow.

The education philosophy is based on the following three principles: that equal significance be put on moral, intellectual, physical, social and aesthetic development, equal emphasis laid on arts and sciences and equal importance attached to learning Chinese and English.  It aims to provide a high-quality, all-rounded education so that the students can have the best opportunity to study, develop their potential to the fullest and acquire positive attitudes and values towards work, life and the community.

Information technology in education 
The School Administration and Management System (SAMS) has been adopted and efforts have been made to strengthen the related facilities, for example, installing nodes in the school campus and using broadband network in order to gain faster access to the Internet.

Both teachers and students can have access to the Internet via the developed intranet system in the school.  In addition, educational CD-ROMs have been purchased for teaching purposes. Projection screens are installed in classrooms, special rooms and the assembly hall.

There are about sixty computers and each teacher of the school is provided with a notebook computer which can be connected with the projectors and TV sets in the classrooms.  About one hundred and twenty computers are available on loan for needy students of the school. All teachers and students are given free e-mail accounts.

To provide students with easy access to and arouse their interest in information technology, the Computer Rooms are open to the students during lunchtime and after school. Guidance from staff is available.

In 2001, all of the staff completed the school-based information technology elementary, intermediate or advanced training courses and reached the IT standard set by the government. Meanwhile, information technology is widely applied to the teaching and learning of different subjects.

School facilities and resources 
There are twenty-six standard classrooms, three lifts, an assembly hall, a library, two playgrounds, four laboratories and a number of special rooms like six computer rooms, a student activity center, a dancing room, interview rooms and a broadcasting studio.  There are also facilities for the physically disabled.  The assembly hall, the library, classrooms and special rooms are all air-conditioned.  A computerized roll call taking system and an information booth have been installed.  The opened playground is surfaced with all weather flooring.  All of these facilities aim to provide an ideal teaching and learning environment.

References

External links 

 

Secondary schools in Hong Kong
Educational institutions established in 1978
1978 establishments in Hong Kong